Lucía Lapiedra (born Miriam Sanchez on 31 January 1981 in Vallecas, Madrid, Spain) is a former Spanish pornographic actress, who has been called the Queen of Porn.

Biography
In spite of declaring herself as a pornographic actress at that time, her films were not on sale. Months later she appeared in the Spanish mainstream film Torrente 3: El Protector, directed by Santiago Segura and starring along Oliver Stone.

She participated in the Survivor Spain reality TV show, Perdidos en Honduras, in 2008, and won the competition.

Awards
2005 FICEB Ninfa Prize winner – Best Spanish Starlet – La Santidad del Mal
2006 FICEB Ninfa Prize nominee – Best Spanish Actress – Posesión

Partial filmography
(See external links for complete lists)
Nacho Rides Again
Obsession
Possession
Nacho Vidal iniciando a Lucía Lapiedra
La Venganza de las Ninfas
La Perversion de Lucía - La Santidad del Mal

References

External links 

 
 
 
 

1981 births
Living people
Actresses from Madrid
Spanish pornographic film actresses